Carlos Ramón Hidalgo Ortega is an Ecuadorian former footballer who last played for Barcelona SC.

Honours

Club
 Club Sport Emelec
 Serie A de Ecuador: 2001-2002
 Deportivo Cuenca
 Serie A de Ecuador: 2004
 Club Deportivo El Nacional
 Serie A de Ecuador: 2006-2007

External links

1979 births
Living people
Ecuadorian footballers
C.S. Emelec footballers
S.D. Quito footballers
C.D. Cuenca footballers
C.D. El Nacional footballers
Barcelona S.C. footballers
2002 CONCACAF Gold Cup players

Association football midfielders
Ecuador international footballers